Francesco Damien "Frank" Calegari is a professor of mathematics at the University of Chicago working in number theory and the Langlands program.

Career
Calegari won a bronze medal and a silver medal at the International Mathematical Olympiad while representing Australia in 1992 and 1993 respectively. Calegari received his PhD in mathematics from the University of California, Berkeley in 2002 under the supervision of Ken Ribet.

Calegari was a von Neumann Fellow of mathematics at the Institute for Advanced Study from 2010 to 2011. He is a professor of mathematics at the University of Chicago.

As of 2020, Calegari is an Editor at Mathematische Zeitschrift and an Associate Editor of the Annals of Mathematics.

Research
Calegari works in algebraic number theory, including Langlands reciprocity and torsion classes in the cohomology of arithmetic groups.

Awards
Calegari was a 5-year American Institute of Mathematics Fellow.

Selected publications

Personal life
Mathematician Danny Calegari is Frank Calegari's brother.

References

External links
 

20th-century Australian mathematicians
21st-century  American mathematicians
Number theorists
Living people
Date of birth missing (living people)
Place of birth missing (living people)
University of Chicago faculty
UC Berkeley College of Letters and Science alumni
Institute for Advanced Study visiting scholars
International Mathematical Olympiad participants
Year of birth missing (living people)